Tonmawr are a Welsh rugby union club based in Tonmawr, Neath Port Talbot in South Wales. Tonmawr are a feeder club to the Ospreys regional team.
Tonmawr have a tradition of producing players who go onto represent the Ospreys region - these players include current Scotland defence coachSteve Tandy, winger Kristian Phillips, Wales international centre Ashley Beck and Wales 7's International Stef Andrews.

Notable former players
  Steve Tandy
  Juan Pablo Socino
  Kristian Phillips
  Ashley Beck
  Jonathan Gravelle
  Taulupe Faletau
  Kuli Faletau
  Tal Selley
  Gomer Hughes
  Rees Stephens
 Stef Andrews
  Taunaholo Taufahema
 Rhyddian Piles
  Ron Tonmawr
 Mark Jones
 Ioan Hawkes
 Gethin Rhys Thomas

Club honours
 WRU Division three West central B Champions - 2017/18
 WRU Division One West Champions - 2007/08, 2009/10
 WRU Division Six West Champions - 2012/13
 Glamorgan County Silver Ball Trophy Winners - 2006/07, 2007/08
 Aberavon Green Stars - Richard Barry Invitation Sevens Winners - 2008/09, 2009/10
 Benidorm International Invitation Sevens Winners - 2008/09
 Glamorgan County Presidents Cup Winners - 2007/08
 Neath Port Talbot Sports Council ‘Team of the Year’ -  2007
 WRU Division Two West Champions - 2003/04, 2006/07
 O.G. Davies Cup Winners - 1998/99
 O.G. Davies Cup Sevens Winners - 1993/94
 Glamorgan County Silver Ball Trophy  Finalists - 1992/93
 Wistech Central Glamorgan League Division 1 Champions - 1993/94
 Promoted to Heineken Division 5 - 1993/94
 Wistech Central Glamorgan League Division 2 Champions - 1992/93
 Wistech Central Glamorgan League Division 3 Champions - 1987/88
 Admission into the Welsh Rugby Union - 1986/87
 Welsh Brewers Cup Winners - 1985/86
 Aberavon District Ushers League Table Champions 1984/85
 Aberavon District Cup Winners 1981/82
 Aberavon District Ushers League Division Champions 1981/82, 1982/83
 Aberavon District Ushers Merit Table Champions 1981/82, 1983/84
 Aberavon District Pat Lahive Memorial Winners 1974/75, 1983/84
 Aberavon District Burton Cup Winners 1952/53, 1958/59
 Aberavon District Hospital Cup Winners  1937/38

References

Welsh rugby union teams
Rugby union in Neath Port Talbot